The Neotia University (TNU) is a UGC recognised Private University in Kolkata, West Bengal, India. Founded on 3rd day of February 2015 vide the West Bengal State Government Act XXIII of 2014, assent of the Governor was first published in the Kolkata Gazette, Extraordinary, of 21 January 2015.

TNU is primarily offering courses in various field of Technology, Maritime Studies, Agriculture, and in other general areas of education.

History
The family of the Founder and Chancellor Harshavardhan Neotia were co-promoters of the cement giant, Ambuja Cement Ltd.

Ambuja Neotia Group, with a strong sense of social commitment, extends its capabilities towards the development of education. The Neotia family started its involvement in education with Neotia Institute of Technology, Management and Science (NITMAS), previously known as Institute of Technology and Marine Engineering (ITME), a college established in 2002, affiliated to the then West Bengal University of Technology, which is now known as Maulana Abul Kalam Azad University of Technology (MAKAUT). The Neotia University (TNU) was established vide the West Bengal State Government Act XXIII of 2014. Though TNU is relatively new in its present configuration, it has its antecedents in the 14-year-old institution.

Academics 
The University offers 6 undergraduate programmes in Bachelor of Technology (B.Tech 4 years)/ Masters in Technology (M.Tech 2 years) like B.Tech./ M.Tech. in Robotic Engineering, B.Tech./ M.Tech. in Energy Engineering, B.Tech./ M.Tech. in Mechanical Engineering with specialization in Automobile Manufacturing, B.Tech./M.Tech. in Computer Science Engineering with specialization in Cyber Security, B.Tech./ M.Tech. in Computer Science Engineering with specialization in Data Analytics, B.Tech in Marine Engineering (DG Shipping Approved). Four year undergraduate programmes in B.Sc (Agriculture) & B. Fisheries Sciences have been introduced from 2018 and 2019 respectively. Undergraduate programmes are of 3 years in case of Bachelor of Nautical Science, BNS (DG Shipping Approved), Bachelor of Science (Hons.) in Applied Psychology, and Bachelor of Arts (Hons) in English. An Integrated programme of 5 years in Master of Science in Biotechnology and Bioinformatics is available apart from 2 years Post Graduate degrees in Master of Science in Applied Psychology and Master of Arts in English.

See also 
 Mr. Harshavardhan Neotia
 Suresh Kumar Neotia
 NITMAS/ ITME
 Atlético de Kolkata
 Kolkata

References 

 

Private universities in India
Universities in Kolkata
Universities and colleges in South 24 Parganas district
Educational institutions established in 2015
2015 establishments in West Bengal